The Anglican Church of St Mary the Virgin in Ston Easton, Somerset, England, is a Grade II* listed building dating from the 11th century, with a 15th-century embattled 3-stage west tower.

The most striking interior feature is the Norman chancel arch, with semi-circular head and colonettes. The pews, choir stalls, altar rails, pulpit, font and screen are all 19th century. There are several 18th and 19th century wall monuments particularly to the Hippisley Coxe family of Ston Easton Park, who have their own chapel at the east end of the north aisle.

The chancel was rebuilt in 1707 and the south aisle around 1800.

The church underwent significant rebuilding in the 19th century, by Arthur Blomfield, which included dismantling most of the building including the Norman arch, marking each stone and then rebuilding them in the same position.

The parish is part of the benefice of Chewton Mendip and the archdeanery of Wells.

See also 
 List of ecclesiastical parishes in the Diocese of Bath and Wells

References

11th-century church buildings in England
15th-century church buildings in England
Towers completed in the 15th century
Church of England church buildings in Mendip District
Grade II* listed churches in Somerset
Grade II* listed buildings in Mendip District